These are the Official Charts Company's UK Independent Singles Chart number-one singles of 2022.

Chart history

Notes
 – The single was simultaneously number-one on the singles chart.
 - The artist was simultaneously number one on the Independent Albums Chart.

Number-one Indie artists

See also
List of UK Dance Singles Chart number ones of 2022
List of UK R&B Singles Chart number ones of 2022
List of UK Rock & Metal Singles Chart number ones of 2022
List of UK Independent Albums Chart number ones of 2022

References

External links
Indie Singles Top 40 at the Official Charts Company
UK Top 30 Indie Singles Chart at BBC Radio 1

2022 in British music
United Kingdom Indie Singles
Indie 2022